George Baer Jr. (1763April 3, 1834) was a slave owner and United States Representative from the fourth district of Maryland, serving from 1797 to 1801 and from 1815 to 1817.

Baer attended the common schools as a child, and later engaged in mercantile pursuits.  He became a member of the Maryland House of Delegates in 1794.  He was later elected as a Federalist to the Fifth and Sixth Congresses, serving from March 4, 1797, to March 3, 1801.  He again served as a member of the Maryland House of Delegates in 1808 and 1809, and also as a judge of the orphans’ court of Frederick County in 1813.  He was elected as a Federalist to the Fourteenth Congress, serving from March 4, 1815, to March 3, 1817, afterwards resuming his former mercantile pursuits.  He was also mayor of Frederick in 1820, and died there in 1834.  He is interred in Mount Olivet Cemetery.

References

External links

1763 births
1834 deaths
Maryland state court judges
Members of the Maryland House of Delegates
Mayors of Frederick, Maryland
Federalist Party members of the United States House of Representatives from Maryland
Burials at Mount Olivet Cemetery (Frederick, Maryland)